Cuba Township may refer to the following townships in the United States:

 Cuba Township, Lake County, Illinois
 Cuba Township, Becker County, Minnesota
 Cuba Township, Barnes County, North Dakota